Saulo Cavalari (born 23 May 1989) is a Brazilian light heavyweight kickboxer and mixed martial artist, fighting out of Thai Brasil team in Curitiba, Paraná, Brazil. He has competed in K-1 and is currently signed to GLORY, where he is a former Glory Light Heavyweight Champion.

Biography and career
After achieving impressive fighting record and winning numerous titles he faced Pavel Zhuravlev in a non-tournament bout at the K-1 World Grand Prix 2012 in Tokyo Final 16 on 14 October 2012 and lost via unanimous decision.

In 2013 he signed for GLORY promotion, joining light heavyweight division, making his debut on Glory 11: Chicago event, winning on points against highly ranked Filip Verlinden on 12 October.

On 23 November 2013 he knocked out Mourad Bouzidi in first round at Glory 12: New York undercard in New York City, New York.

Competing for the inaugural Glory Light Heavyweight Championship, he fought in the Glory 15: Istanbul - Light Heavyweight World Championship Tournament in Istanbul, Turkey on 12 April 2014, losing to Tyrone Spong via unanimous decision in the semi-finals.

Cavalari had a rematch with Mwekassa for the vacant Glory Light Heavyweight Championship at Bellator MMA & Glory: Dynamite 1 on 19 September 2015.  He won the fight via unanimous decision.

Kickboxing record

|-  bgcolor="#FFBBBB"
| 2023-02-17 || Loss ||align=left| Petr Romankevich || REN TV Fight Club || Minsk, Belarus || KO (Knee) || 2 || 1:19
|-
|-  bgcolor="#FFBBBB"
| 2017-07-14 || Loss ||align=left| Pavel Zhuravlev|| Glory 43: New York || New York City, New York || Decision (unanimous) || 3 || 3:00
|-
|-  bgcolor="#FFBBBB"
| 2017-02-24 ||Loss  ||align=left| Artem Vakhitov || Glory 38: Chicago || Hoffman Estates, Illinois, USA ||TKO (punches)  || 2 || 2:43
|-
! style=background:white colspan=9 |
|-
|-  bgcolor="#CCFFCC"
| 2016-10-21 || Win ||align=left| Brian Douwes || Glory 34: Denver || Broomfield, Colorado, USA || Decision (unanimous) || 3 || 3:00
|-
|-  bgcolor="#FFBBBB"
| 2016-03-12 || Loss ||align=left| Artem Vakhitov || Glory 28: Paris || Paris, France || Decision (unanimous) || 5 || 3:00
|-
! style=background:white colspan=9 |
|-
|-  bgcolor="#CCFFCC"
| 2015-09-19 || Win ||align=left| Zack Mwekassa || Bellator MMA & Glory: Dynamite 1 || San Jose, California, USA || Decision (majority) || 5 || 3:00
|-
! style=background:white colspan=9 |
|-
|-  bgcolor="#CCFFCC"
| 2015-04-03 || Win ||align=left| Artem Vakhitov || Glory 20: Dubai || Dubai, UAE || Decision (Split) || 3 || 3:00
|-
! style=background:white colspan=9 |
|-
|-  bgcolor="#CCFFCC"
| 2014-11-07 || Win ||align=left| Zack Mwekassa || Glory 18: Oklahoma, Finals || Oklahoma City, Oklahoma, USA || KO (high kick) || 3 || 0:20
|-
! style=background:white colspan=9 |
|-
|-  bgcolor="#CCFFCC"
| 2014-11-07 || Win ||align=left| Danyo Ilunga || Glory 18: Oklahoma, Semi Finals || Oklahoma City, Oklahoma, USA || Decision (unanimous) || 3 || 3:00
|-
|-  bgcolor= "#FFBBBB"
| 2014-04-12 || Loss ||align=left| Tyrone Spong || Glory 15: Istanbul - Light Heavyweight World Championship Tournament, Semi Finals || Istanbul, Turkey || Decision (unanimous) || 3 || 3:00
|-
|-  bgcolor="#CCFFCC"
| 2013-11-23 || Win ||align=left| Mourad Bouzidi || Glory 12: New York || New York City, New York, USA || KO (overhand right) || 1 || 1:23
|-
|-  bgcolor="#CCFFCC"
| 2013-10-12 || Win ||align=left| Filip Verlinden || Glory 11: Chicago || Hoffman Estates, Illinois, USA || Decision (unanimous) || 3 || 3:00 
|-
|-  bgcolor="#CCFFCC"
| 2013-07-27 || Win ||align=left| Felipe Micheletti  || WGP 14 || São Paulo, Brazil || TKO || 5 || 
|-
! style=background:white colspan=9 |
|- 
|-  bgcolor= "#FFBBBB"
| 2012-10-14 || Loss ||align=left| Pavel Zhuravlev || K-1 World Grand Prix 2012 in Tokyo Final 16 || Tokyo, Japan || Decision (Unanimous) || 3 || 3:00 
|- 
|-  bgcolor= "#FFBBBB"
| 2012-06-02 || Loss ||align=left| Tomasz Sarara || Tatneft Cup 2012 2nd selection 1/4 final || Kazan, Russia || Decision (Unanimous) || 4 || 3:00 
|-
|-  bgcolor= "#CCFFCC"
| 2012-04-05 || Win ||align=left| Andrey Shmakov || Tatneft Cup 2012 4th selection 1/8 final || Kazan, Russia || KO (low kick) || 2 || 
|-
|-  bgcolor= "#CCFFCC"
| 2012-02-11 || Win ||align=left| Ricardo Soneca || Tatneft Cup Brasil || Brasil || Decision (unanimous) || 3 || 3:00
|-
|-  bgcolor= "#CCFFCC"
| 2011-09-03 || Win ||align=left| Jhonata Diniz || VII Desafio Profissional de Muay Thai, final || São Paulo, Brazil || Decision (unanimous) || 3 || 3:00
|-
! style=background:white colspan=9 |
|- 
|-  bgcolor= "#CCFFCC"
| 2011-09-03 || Win ||align=left| Thiago Beowulf || VII Desafio Profissional de Muay Thai, semi finals || São Paulo, Brazil || Decision (unanimous) || 3 || 3:00
|-
|-  bgcolor= "#CCFFCC"
| 2011-06-11 || Win ||align=left| Anísio Leite || Samurai FC 5 - Limited Edition || Brazil || KO (Left hook & Flying knee)
| 1 ||0:37
|-
|-  bgcolor= "#CCFFCC"
| 2010-08-14 || Win ||align=left| Thiago Beowulf || VI Desafio Profissional de Muay Thai 1ºRound || São Paulo, Brazil || Decision (unanimous) || 3 || 3:00
|-
|-  bgcolor= "#CCFFCC"
| 2009 || Win ||align=left| Marcelo Correa  || Jungle Fight SP ||  || KO (punches) || 1 || 
|-
|-  bgcolor= "#CCFFCC"
|  || Win ||align=left| Jhonata Diniz  ||  ||  || Decision || 3 || 
|-
|-
| colspan=9 | Legend:

Bare knuckle record

|-
|Loss
|align=center|1-1
| Patryk Tołkaczewski
|KO
|Gromda 8
|
|align=center|1
|align=center|0:06
|Pionki Poland
|
|-
|Win
|align=center|1–0
| Denis Nedashkovsky
|TKO
|Hardcore Fighting Championship
|
|align=center|1
|align=center|0:34
|Russia
|
|-

See also
 List of male kickboxers

References

1989 births
Living people
Brazilian male kickboxers
Brazilian male mixed martial artists
Brazilian Muay Thai practitioners
Brazilian people of indigenous peoples descent
Cruiserweight kickboxers
Light heavyweight kickboxers
Light heavyweight mixed martial artists
Mixed martial artists utilizing Muay Thai
Bare-knuckle boxers
Sportspeople from Curitiba